Daniel Hellebuyck (5 July 1933 – 26 May 2001) was a Belgian boxer. He competed in the men's bantamweight event at the 1956 Summer Olympics.

References

1933 births
2001 deaths
Belgian male boxers
Olympic boxers of Belgium
Boxers at the 1956 Summer Olympics
Sportspeople from East Flanders
Bantamweight boxers